Berge der guten Hoffnung are two mountain peaks of Bavaria, Germany.
Mountains of Bavaria
Mountains of the Alps